is Morning Musume's 7th single, released on September 9, 1999 as an 8 cm CD. It sold a total of 1,646,630 copies, making it a massive hit (a #1 single in Japan) and their highest selling single. In 2004, it was re-released as part of the Early Single Box and again in 2005 as a 12 cm CD. The single also marked the debut of the "Third Generation" member Maki Goto and the departure of Aya Ishiguro.

Packaging
The original 8 cm CD release was housed in a J-card-type 12 cm slimline single case instead of the then-industry CD snap-pack packaging. The case used was 7 mm thick, showing artwork through the front, and also through the spine and part of the back of the case. The CD itself was inserted upside-down, allowing the artwork on the disc itself to show through the transparent back of the case. This is one of only two 8 cm CD singles released by Morning Musume to adhere this packaging (the other being their eighth single Koi no Dance Site (2000)).

Legacy
In 2008, a remade version of the song was released by Scott Murphy of Allister in his album Guilty Pleasures 3.

In 2009, the song was remade into Korean by South Korean girl group After School under the name "Dream Girl", and Avex Group posted a "RIKI version" by actor Riki Takeuchi on its official YouTube channel in celebration of the song's tenth anniversary.

In 2013, Moametal of the kawaii metal group Babymetal performed a cover during their Legend 1999 show at NHK Hall.
The song was chosen because it was a hit in 1999, the year of Moametal and fellow member Yuimetal's birth.

Love Machine is featured in Ubisoft's Japanese Just Dance Wii U

Track listing 
The lyricist, composer and producer of both songs is Tsunku. "Love Machine" was arranged by Dance☆Man, while "21seiki" was arranged by Shunsuke Suzuki.

8 cm CD 
This is the original edition of the single and has a catalog number, EPDE-1052.
  – 5:02
  – 4:45
  – 5:01

LP 
This edition has a catalog number, EPJE-5035.
 A side
 
 
 B side

12 cm CD 
This edition was released as the 7th disc of the Early Single Box with catalogue number EPCE-5327 and as an individual release with catalog number EPCE-5319.

Members at time of single 
1st generation: Yuko Nakazawa, Natsumi Abe, Aya Ishiguro , Kaori Iida
2nd generation: Sayaka Ichii, Mari Yaguchi, Kei Yasuda
3rd generation : Maki Goto

Personnel

LOVE Machine 
 Dance☆Man - Arranger
 The Band☆Man
 Hyu Hyu - Drums
 Toca - Bass
 Jump Man - Guitar
 Bomb - Guitar
 Wata-Boo - Keyboard
 Stage Chakka Man - Percussion
 D.J. Ichiro - Turntable
 Tsunku - Chorus

21 Seiki 
 Shunsuke Suzuki - Arranger
 Tatsuya Murakami - Strings arranger

Cover versions 
 Janet Kay with Ai Takahashi covered the song in English on her 2012 cover album Idol Kay.

References

External links 
 Entries on the Hello! Project official website: CD entry, LP entry 
 VHS entry on the Up-Front Works official website 

Morning Musume songs
Zetima Records singles
1999 singles
Oricon Weekly number-one singles
Songs written by Tsunku
Song recordings produced by Tsunku
Japanese-language songs
1999 songs
Japanese synth-pop songs